The 2014 CAF Champions League Final was the final of the 2014 CAF Champions League, the 50th edition of Africa's premier club football tournament organized by the Confederation of African Football (CAF), and the 18th edition under the current CAF Champions League format.

The final was contested in two-legged home-and-away format between AS Vita Club of Democratic Republic of the Congo and ES Sétif of Algeria. The first leg was hosted by AS Vita Club at the Stade Tata Raphaël in Kinshasa on 26 October 2014, while the second leg was hosted by ES Sétif at the Stade Mustapha Tchaker in Blida on 1 November 2014. The winner earned the right to represent the CAF at the 2014 FIFA Club World Cup, entering at the quarterfinal stage, as well as play in the 2015 CAF Super Cup against the winner of the 2014 CAF Confederation Cup.

Both matches ended in draws, 2–2 in the first leg, and 1–1 in the second leg, giving ES Sétif the title on the away goals rule (3–3 on aggregate).

Qualified teams
In the following table, finals until 1996 were in the African Cup of Champions Club era, since 1997 were in the CAF Champions League era.

Background
AS Vita Club had reached the final of the African Cup of Champions Clubs (predecessor of the CAF Champions League) twice, winning in 1973 and losing in 1981.

ES Sétif had reached the final of the African Cup of Champions Clubs once, winning in 1988. They were the first Algerian side to reach the final of Africa's premier club championship since 1990.

Venues

Stade Tata Raphaël

Stade Tata Raphaël (Father Raphael Stadium) is a multi-purpose stadium in Kinshasa, Democratic Republic of the Congo.  Originally known as Stade Roi Baudouin (King Baudouin Stadium) when it was inaugurated in 1952 and Stade du 20 Mai (20 May Stadium) in 1967, it was used mostly for football matches. The stadium has a maximum capacity of 50,000 people.

The stadium's most famous event was The Rumble in the Jungle boxing match between Muhammad Ali and George Foreman for the Undisputed WBC/WBA Heavyweight Championship that took place on October 30, 1974. 60,000 people attended the boxing match. In what was ranked as a great upset, Ali knocked out the previously undefeated Foreman in eight rounds. The associated music festival, Zaire 74, that took place at the stadium six weeks prior to the boxing match, included such stars as James Brown and B.B. King.

Following the downfall of President Mobutu Sese Seko's regime in 1997, the stadium was renamed Stade Tata Raphaël after Raphaël de la Kethulle de Ryhove, initiator of the stadium in 1952.

Mustapha Tchaker Stadium

Mustapha Tchaker Stadium is a multi-purpose stadium in Blida, Algeria.  It is currently used mostly for football matches.  The stadium has a capacity of 37,000 people. The stadium is the home of the Algeria national football team.

The stadium was inaugurated on 26 February 2001.

The first local match of the USM Blida at Mustapha Tchaker Stadium took place there 30 August 2001. This is, then, a first match of Algerian championship (D1) against USM Alger (0-0).

It becomes the main stadium of the Algerian football team from 2008. However, the first international match to be held there in 20 August 2002. It is, then, a friendly match against the DR Congo national football team (1-1).

It is regarded as a lucky charm by the Algerian fans and as a "impregnable fortress" by the specialists. Indeed, the Algerian team has never lost in this stadium.

The ES Sétif administration confirmed that the selection of the Blida stadium is because it has all the necessary conditions to organize a final match.

Road to final

Note: In all results below, the score of the finalist is given first (H: home; A: away).

Format
The final was played on a home-and-away two-legged basis. If the sides were level on aggregate after the second leg, the away goals rule was applied, and if still level, the tie proceeded directly to a penalty shoot-out (no extra time was played).

Matches

First leg
The opening goal came in the 17th minute when a corner from the right was turned in past his own goalkeeper by Firmin Ndombe Mubele at the near post to give ES Sétif the lead. AS Vita Club got the equalizer in injury time in the first half from a penalty after handball in the box by Mohamed Lagraâ. Chikito Lema Mabidi took the penalty, shooting right footed to the right of the goalkeeper. ES Sétif regained the lead in the 57th minute when Akram Djahnit finished low to the net from close range after taking the ball around the goalkeeper. Mabidi tied the game at 2-2 in the 77th minute with a long range shot from 30 yards with his right foot.

Second leg
Sofiane Younès scored the opening goal for ES Sétif in the second leg after 49 minutes when he turned the ball into the net from a yard out at the back post after a cross from the right. Chikito Lema Mabidi equalized for AS Vita Club in the 53rd minute with a powerful right footed shot from outside the penalty area after a pass from the right.	
The draw meant that ES Sétif won the final on the away goals rule.

References

External links
Orange CAF Champions League 2014, CAFonline.com

2014
Final
AS Vita Club matches
ES Sétif matches
International club association football competitions hosted by the Democratic Republic of the Congo